Scott 2 is the second solo album by Scott Walker, released in 1968 by Philips Records in the UK and Smash Records in the US. Featuring the minor hit "Jackie", it arrived at the height of Walker's commercial success as a solo artist, topping the UK Albums Chart.

This album, alongside Scott, features Phil Spector's "Wall of Sound" recording technique. Like its predecessor, Scott 2 comprises an assortment of pop cover versions, selections from Walker favorite Jacques Brel, and a handful of original songs. His following three albums would feature mostly or entirely original material.

Overview
Scott 2 follows the formula of Walker's début release, with a mixture of contemporary covers ("Black Sheep Boy", "The Windows of the World") Jacques Brel interpretations ("Jackie", "Next", "The Girls and the Dogs"), film songs ("Wait Until Dark", "Come Next Spring") and his own original compositions ("The Amorous Humphrey Plugg", "The Girls from the Streets", "Plastic Palace People", "The Bridge"). The content of his own and Brel's material was markedly more risqué than on Scott, with "Jackie", "Next" and "The Girls from the Streets" standing out with themes of sexual tribulations and decadent lifestyles, while the contributions of Walker's regular arrangers and the structures of his own compositions were becoming more adventurous and progressive.

According to Jonathan King, writing in the liner notes to Scott 2, not long after the album had been completed Walker described it as the "work of a lazy, self-indulgent man." He added, "Now the nonsense must stop, and the serious business must begin." King continues about Walker: "I have no doubt that many years from now, over a space age dinner of vitamins, [...] he will say: 'Well, the last fifty years have been great fun, but now we must get down to doing something worthwhile.' And he'll mean it."

Release and reception
The album, released on Philips Records in March 1968, reached #1 for one week and stayed in the UK Albums Chart for eighteen weeks. The album was preceded by the single "Jackie" in late 1967. The single met with controversy in the UK because of lyrics like "authentic queers and phony virgins" and drug references. The song was banned by the BBC and was not performed on BBC TV or played on the mainstream radio channels. The song eventually charted at #22. The album was eventually released in the United States in July 1968 with different artwork, but sold poorly.

"A record about real stuff with quite disturbing imagery," remarked Neil Hannon, frontman of The Divine Comedy.
British singer/songwriter Marvin B. Naylor referenced Walker's song Plastic Palace People in the title of his 2009 album The Last Flight Of Billy Balloon and in the song Beautiful Balloon from the same album.

Track listing

Chart positions

Personnel
Angela Morley – arrangements and conductor (Tracks 1, 2, 12)
Reg Guest – arrangements and conductor (Tracks 3, 4, 9)
Peter Knight – arrangements and conductor (Tracks 6, 4)
Peter Olliff – engineer

Release history

References

Scott Walker (singer) albums
Song recordings with Wall of Sound arrangements
1968 albums
Fontana Records albums
Albums conducted by Wally Stott
Albums arranged by Wally Stott
Albums conducted by Peter Knight (composer)
Albums arranged by Peter Knight (composer)
Albums produced by Johnny Franz
Philips Records albums
Smash Records albums